Antoine Bellier and Gabriel Décamps were the defending champions but chose not to compete.

Sanjar Fayziev and Markos Kalovelonis won the title after defeating Mikael Torpegaard and Kaichi Uchida 6–7(3–7), 6–4, [10–4] in the final.

Seeds

Draw

References

External links
 Main draw

Shymkent Challenger II - Doubles
2022 Doubles